The Philippine House Committee on Suffrage and Electoral Reforms, or House Suffrage and Electoral Reforms Committee is a standing committee of the Philippine House of Representatives.

Jurisdiction 
As prescribed by House Rules, the committee's jurisdiction includes the following:
 Protection and advancement of the right of suffrage
 Conduct of elections, plebiscites, initiatives, recalls and referendums

Members, 18th Congress

Historical members

18th Congress

Member for the Majority 
 Francisco Datol Jr. (SENIOR CITIZENS)

See also 
 House of Representatives of the Philippines
 List of Philippine House of Representatives committees
 Commission on Elections
 Elections in the Philippines

Notes

References

External links 
House of Representatives of the Philippines

Suffrage and Electoral Reforms
Elections in the Philippines